Charles L. Finley (October 18, 1907 – May 1, 1972) was an American basketball and baseball head coach, primarily at the University of Idaho in Moscow.

Hired by Idaho in the summer of 1947, Finley led Vandal basketball for seven seasons, then a member of the Pacific Coast Conference. For the first six years, he was concurrently the head coach of the baseball team. He succeeded Guy Wicks, who also coached both sports and moved out of athletics to an administrative position with the university. With the overlap of the two seasons increasing,  was hired as head baseball coach after the 

Finley served in the U.S. Navy during World War II, and coached a season at the Texas School of Mines in El Paso (now UTEP) in  He was the athletic director and coached two sports at the New Mexico School of Mines in Socorro prior to his stint at Idaho, and was also a baseball scout for the Boston Braves 

As a collegian in the early 1930s, he played for legendary coach Henry Iba at Northwest Missouri State in 

After seven years at Idaho, Finley left in April 1954 for Mississippi Southern, then an independent in NAIA. He was the head coach for three seasons in Hattiesburg.

Head coaching record

References

External links
 Sports Reference – Charles Finley
 

1907 births
1972 deaths
American men's basketball players
College men's basketball head coaches in the United States
Idaho Vandals baseball coaches
Idaho Vandals men's basketball coaches
New Mexico Mines Miners athletic directors
New Mexico Mines Miners men's basketball coaches
Northwest Missouri State Bearcats men's basketball players
Southern Miss Golden Eagles basketball coaches
United States Navy officers
United States Navy personnel of World War II
UTEP Miners men's basketball coaches